Domingo Cecílio Alzugaray (22 November 1932 – 24 July 2017) was an Argentine-born Brazilian actor and journalist who was the founding editor of ISTOÉ, established in 1976.

Selected filmography
Bendita seas (1956)
Pobres habrá siempre (1958)
Three Loves in Rio (1959)
Con el más puro amor (1966)

References

External links

1932 births
2017 deaths
Brazilian magazine founders
Argentine emigrants to Brazil
20th-century Argentine male actors
Argentine male film actors
Deaths from Alzheimer's disease
Deaths from dementia in Brazil